Pole is a rural locality (a village) in Chekuyevskoye Rural Settlement of Onezhsky District, Arkhangelsk Oblast, Russia. The population was 82 as of 2010.

Geography 
Pole is located on the Kodina River, 89 km southeast of Onega (the district's administrative centre) by road. Bolshoy Bor is the nearest rural locality.

References 

Rural localities in Onezhsky District
Onezhsky Uyezd